The 1983–84 Iraq FA Cup was the eighth edition of the Iraq FA Cup as a clubs-only competition. The tournament was won by Al-Sinaa for the first time, beating Al-Shabab 5–4 on penalties in the final after a 0–0 draw on 14 June 1984. Al-Shabab reached the final by beating Al-Tijara, who had earlier knocked out Al-Zawraa 2–1 and Al-Shorta on penalties after a 0–0 draw.

Matches

Final

References

External links
 Iraqi Football Website

Iraq FA Cup
Cup